The 2001 Formula Rally Championship was a one off series for rally cars running to Super 1600 regulations. The championship was run as a replacement for the cancelled 2001 British Rally Championship. Technical regulations stated that cars must not cost more than $100,000 and only 4 mechanics were allowed to work on a single car in services to control costs. Rallies in the series also counted as point scoring rounds for the one make Ford Puma, Ford Ka, Volkswagen Polo and Peugeot 106 championships. The series was won by 1998 British Rally Champion Martin Rowe after Justin Dale and the Peugeot Works Team were excluded from the championship due to a homologation issue at the final round. The same homologation issues also led to the exclusion of the Works Proton team and its driver Mats Andersson. Ford were the manufacturers champions.

Calendar

Entry List

Drivers Championship

Manufacturers Championship

References
 Rallybase

British Rally Championship seasons
Formula Rally Championship
British Rally Championship